Krzanowice  is a village in the administrative district of Gmina Dobrzeń Wielki, within Opole County, Opole Voivodeship, in south-western Poland.

The village has a population of 400.

References

Krzanowice